Business as usual may refer to:

 Business as usual (business), the normal execution of operations within an organization
 Business as usual (policy), policy of the British government in World War I

Film, television and theatre
 Business as Usual (film), 1987 British drama directed by Lezli-An Barrett
 "Business as Usual" (Haven), 24th episode of American-Canadian TV series Haven
 "Business as Usual" (Star Trek: Deep Space Nine), 116th episode of the television series Star Trek: Deep Space Nine
 "Business as Usual", 14th episode of TV series Flashpoint

Music
 Business as Usual (EPMD album), 1990 album by Hip Hop duo EPMD
 Business as Usual (Haystak & Jelly Roll album), 2013 album by rappers Haystak and Jelly Roll
 Business as Usual (Men at Work album), 1981 album by Australian new wave band Men at Work
Business as Usual (Secret Affair album), 1982 album by mod revival band Secret Affair
 Business as Usual, 2006 album by Boo-Yaa T.R.I.B.E.
 Business as Usual, 2006 album by Da Brakes
 Business as Usual, album by Robin McAuley
 "Business as Usual", song by The Eagles from Long Road Out of Eden
 "Business as Usual", song by Little Feat from Let It Roll
 "Business as Usual", song by Staggered Crossing from Last Summer When We Were Famous

See also
Politics as usual (disambiguation)
 Business (disambiguation)
 Bau (disambiguation)